George Gardner Fagg (April 30, 1934 – July 14, 2015) was a United States circuit judge of the United States Court of Appeals for the Eighth Circuit.

Education and career

Born in Eldora, Iowa, Fagg received a Bachelor of Arts degree from Drake University in 1956, and a Juris Doctor from Drake University Law School in 1958. After practicing law in Marshalltown, Iowa from 1958 to 1972, he was appointed to the Iowa state district court bench in the 2nd Judicial District, where he served from 1972 to 1982.

Federal judicial service

Fagg was nominated by President Ronald Reagan on September 22, 1982, to a seat on the United States Court of Appeals for the Eighth Circuit that was vacated when Judge Roy Laverne Stephenson assumed senior status. He was confirmed by the United States Senate on October 1, 1982, and received his commission the same day. He assumed senior status on May 1, 1999. Fagg died on July 14, 2015 in Johnston, Iowa.

References

External links
 

1934 births
2015 deaths
Drake University alumni
Judges of the United States Court of Appeals for the Eighth Circuit
Iowa state court judges
People from Eldora, Iowa
People from Marshalltown, Iowa
United States court of appeals judges appointed by Ronald Reagan
20th-century American judges
Drake University Law School alumni